Saint Jerome is a 1609 painting by El Greco, now in the Frick Collection, New York.

The artist frequently returned to this subject and here shows Jerome dressed as a cardinal in a pose reminiscent of his Portrait of Cardinal Tavera and Portrait of Jerónimo de Cevallos, pointing at an open book on a table covered with a green tapestry. The deep folds in the garments point to the influence of Michelangelo and Byzantine icon painting.

References

Bibliography (in Spanish)
 ÁLVAREZ LOPERA, José, El Greco, Madrid, Arlanza, 2005, Biblioteca «Descubrir el Arte», (colección «Grandes maestros»). .
 SCHOLZ-HÄNSEL, Michael, El Greco, Colonia, Taschen, 2003. .
 https://web.archive.org/web/20100918075528/http://www.artehistoria.jcyl.es/genios/cuadros/1708.htm

El Greco
Paintings by El Greco
1609 paintings
Paintings in the collection of the Metropolitan Museum of Art
Books in art